Grace High School is the public secondary school in Grace, Idaho, southeast of Pocatello. It serves grades 7-12 for the Grace Joint School District.

Academics 
In the 2022-23 US News and World Report annual survey of US public high schools, Grace ranked 37th in Idaho and 6,932nd in the country.
The school is accredited by the Northwest Association of Schools and Colleges.

Athletics 

The high school supports American football, basketball (boys and girls), volleyball, track & field, golf, and cross country. The high school's mascot is the Grizzlies; it was formerly the Red Devils until 1978. School colors are red, white, and gray. The school's football field/track is named Roswell Field, and the gymnasium is named Greenwood Gymnasium.

Notable people

 Dick Motta - National Basketball Association (NBA) head basketball coach; his first head coaching job was at Grace, where he won a state championship.
Phil Johnson - NCAA men's basketball coach

References

External links

Grace School District #148

Schools in Caribou County, Idaho
Educational institutions established in 1953
Public high schools in Idaho
1953 establishments in Idaho